Ab Kaseh-ye Tal Deraz (also Romanized as Āb Kāseh-ye Tal Derāz; also known as Āb Kāseh) is a village in Ludab Rural District, Ludab District, Boyer-Ahmad County, Kohgiluyeh and Boyer-Ahmad Province, Iran. At the 2006 census, its population was 50, in 9 families.

References 

Populated places in Boyer-Ahmad County